The Rome Braves are a Minor League Baseball team of the South Atlantic League and the High-A affiliate of the Atlanta Braves. They are located in Rome, Georgia, and play their home games at AdventHealth Stadium. From 2003 to 2020, the team served as Atlanta's Class A, or "Single-A," affiliate before being elevated to High-A with the restructuring of the minor league system in 2021. Rome is the longest-tenured partner club of the Atlanta Braves.

History

Organization's historical beginnings
A longstanding member of the current iteration South Atlantic League since its inception, the Class A Atlanta Braves affiliate's history dates back to 1980 with the founding of the Anderson Braves, sporting a roster featuring future major league talents such as Brett Butler, Brook Jacoby, and Brad Komminsk. The Anderson team received a great deal of support and experienced relatively high attendance figures during its short run. Despite the local support though, former Atlanta Braves owner Ted Turner moved the team to Sumter, South Carolina after the 1984 season to establish the Sumter Braves. Sumter was a starting point for several major league talents, including an early stop for future Baseball Hall of Fame pitcher Tom Glavine. Sumter enjoyed the team for 6 seasons from 1985 to 1990. Notably for both Anderson and Sumter, their best finishes while in both locations came in seasons managed by current Atlanta manager Brian Snitker, who brought the Anderson team to a 72–70 5th-place finish in 1982, and a 77–60 3rd-place finish for Sumter in 1986. In Sumter, the team also earned their first opportunity in the SAL Playoffs as the First Half Champion of the 1985 North Division, going on to lose to the Greensboro Hornets in 2 games.

The Macon Braves
In 1991, the low league Braves saw themselves on the move once more when they transplanted the team to Macon, Georgia, thus becoming the Macon Braves. Macon had a very long history with minor league baseball before their time with the Braves, with the earliest assumed records going all the way back to 1885 with some nameless forms before their predominant history as the Macon Peaches in the original iteration of the South Atlantic League, which is still active today as the AA Southern League. The Braves brought baseball back to Macon following a 3-season gap with the departure of the Pirates affiliate in 1987. As the Macon Braves, the team saw marginal success, earning a playoff bid in their inaugural 1991 season (2–0 series loss to the Columbia Mets), mid or lower pack of the SAL South Division from 1992 to 1996, a 1997 South Division Championship in 1997 which saw them win their first ever Playoff series with a 2–1 win over the Augusta GreenJackets before falling to the Greensboro Bats 2–0 in the following round, subsequent Playoff runs in 1998 (2–0 series loss to Augusta) and 1999 (2–0 series loss to the Hickory Crawdads), and mid pack success in their final 3 seasons in Macon. In total, the team racked up an 850–820 record during their Macon years, with notable alumni such as Al Lopez, John Smoltz, Chipper Jones, and Andruw Jones. The Macon Braves would serve as the last time the city would host a major-league affiliated minor league team.

Moving to Rome

Following failed attempts to get the city of Macon to build a new ballpark for the team, as their home at Luther Williams Field was beginning to show its age and with the team still wanting over $1 Million in renovations, the end of the 2002 season saw Atlanta decide again to move the franchise. Following the approval of a SPLOST tax, the city of Rome, Georgia managed to entice the Braves organization, and as a result they became the new home of the Single-A affiliate starting with the 2003 season. The SPLOST tax helped with entirely building their home, AdventHealth Stadium, and a high level of optimism followed the team to Rome.

2003 Inaugural season and championship
Rocket Wheeler would be named the manager for the 1st season in Rome, and the start of his tenure in the Braves organization after previously serving the past three seasons as the manager for the AA then-Toronto Blue Jays affiliate Tennessee Smokies. During their inaugural season in Rome, the team started the first half of the 2003 South Atlantic League season with a 36–33 record, finishing 4th in the Southern Division and well outside the playoff spot won by Hickory. The second half featured a much better effort, with help from two future Braves fan-favorites in Brian McCann and Jeff Francoeur, and Rome got to a 42–38 record to win the Southern Division in the 2nd half of the season and advance to the Playoffs for the 1st time ever in Rome, and the 6th time overall since the original inception of the team in Anderson in 1980. Not only was it a historic first season in Rome by just making it to the playoffs, but the Rome Braves followed this with 2–1 series win over Hickory to advance to their first ever South Atlantic League Championship, where they met the Lake County Captains. The series went to 4 games, and in their inaugural season, the Rome Braves won the 2003 South Atlantic League with a 3–1 series win over Lake County.

Beginning of Ingle era
After their first team championship in 2003, the following two seasons under Rocket Wheeler saw the team finish with a 70–70 record in 2004, and a 72–65 record in 2005, though neither were able to replicate the similar success of either a Championship or even a divisional crown. Rome went for a managerial change for the 2006 season, calling on Randy Ingle. Ingle served in the Braves organization for his entire 14 seasons prior to joining Rome, including two stops in 1993 and 2001 with Macon. He was also coming off of 4 years as the manager for the then Advanced-A affiliate Myrtle Beach Pelicans. Under Ingle, the 2006 Rome Braves won the 1st half South Division title with a 42–28 record to secure their first playoff trip since the Championship 2003 season, and finished the season with a 71–68 record and a 2–0 series loss to Augusta in the postseason. 2007–2010 saw the Rome Braves unable to climb out of the lower part of the South Division, finishing with losing records in all 4 seasons. Ingle would leave the team for the 2011 season, being sent down to manage the rookie league Danville Braves, however Ingle would return to Rome in 2012, as Rome finished the 2011 season with a 60–80 season and two different managers during the season with Matt Walbeck fired midseason by the organization after compiling a 25–45 bottom of the division record which was one of the worst in the minor leagues, and Walbeck being replaced by Rick Albert who led the team to a 35–35 finish. Ingle's 2012 return started off much poorer than the 2011 Rome start, with Rome compiling an 18–52 record in the 1st half. The 2nd half of the season fared much better for Rome, going 44–24 and securing their first divisional crown in 6 seasons, even despite the overall season finish of 62–72 which would be worst in the Southern Division. The Braves would lose to the eventual 2012 Champion Asheville Tourists 2 games to 1 in their playoff series.

Leadup to 2016 championship
Ingle would serve another season with Rome in 2013, finishing just shy of a 2nd straight trip to the SAL Playoffs during the 2nd half of the season, and finishing with a 73–66 overall record. Jon Schuerholz would take over the team in 2014, swapping managerial duties with Ingle who would return to Danville for 2014. Rome would finish 2014 with a 56–84 record, their 3rd time in the last 5 seasons that the Braves would finish at the bottom of the South Division in overall record. Ingle again returned to the team in 2015, producing a just as disappointing 58–82 record with Rome unable to escape the bottom of the division once again. Sporting one of the youngest clubs in full-season baseball, 2016 looked to be starting the same way under Ingle, with a 27–42 having them at 6th in the division heading into the midseason break. Things got much better though in what would turn out to be another historic season for Rome. Thanks to a pitching room featuring Mike Soroka, Kolby Allard, Max Fried, AJ Minter, and Touki Toussaint, and two big time bats in the form of Ronald Acuña Jr. and Austin Riley, players that majorly make up most of the current major league roster for Atlanta gave Rome one of its biggest pushes and went on to finish the 2nd half with a 43–27 record, once again returning to the playoffs. From there, it was indeed history as the R-Braves would get a 2–1 series win over the division powerhouse Charleston RiverDogs in the semifinals, and then go on to capture their 2nd South Atlantic League title with a 3–1 series victory over the Lakewood BlueClaws.

Ingle's retirement, Rocket's return, start of Tuiasosopo era
Following their second championship season, Ingle would serve one last year as manager for the Rome Braves in 2017, end with his best overall record finish during his time in Rome at 74–65, but unfortunately coming up short of a return to postseason play. 2018 saw Rome return to their past by bringing back Rocket Wheeler, their manager from the 2003 Championship season and the two seasons following. Wheeler had spent his time since leaving Rome in the Braves organization, taking over the Pelicans for 5 seasons following his original departure, getting 1 season as the manager for the AA Mississippi Braves, and 4 seasons on the rookie level before managing the Braves Advanced A ball for the Carolina Mudcats in 2016 and Florida Fire Frogs in 2017. Wheeler's return in 2018 would show quick results with Rome finishing at the top of the South Division in the 1st half with a 40–29 record, though a slight slump in the 2nd half gave them a 31–36 record and 71–65 overall on the season. Rome would be eliminated in the playoffs by the 2nd half division champion, and eventual SAL Champion, Lexington Legends in a 2–0 series loss. For 2019 and into the modern day, Matt Tuiasosopo would be named the Rome Braves manager, and he would lead Rome to a 65–74 overall record while missing the playoffs.

2020 Season cancellation and High-A promotion
Like the entirety of the MiLB, the 2020 season was postponed and later cancelled for Rome following the COVID-19 pandemic. This also came following an off-season of rumors regarding the complete reorganization of the minor leagues, which would come into fruition following the cancellation of the 2020 season. On December 9th, 2020, many of the major league clubs announced their new affiliations, totaling at 120 with each team sporting a Low-A, High-A, AA, and AAA team for 2021 and beyond. Rome was invited, and subsequently accepted said invite, back into the Braves organization as the new High-A affiliate, ending their run since the team's inception as the Low-A affiliate and replacing the Fire Frogs in their new spot. Their fellow South Atlantic League team, the Augusta GreenJackets, would be named the new Low-A affiliate, while the Mississippi Braves and Gwinnett Stripers would retain their status as AA and AAA affiliates for the Braves respectively.

As part of the announcement on February 12, 2021 announcement of the new Professional Development League alignment, Rome accepted their invitation as the High-A affiliate, and signed a new contract with the organization to continue their tenure together through the 2030 season. The announcement also included Rome's new league location, the newly created High-A East, with the Rome Braves joining former South Atlantic League opponents Asheville Tourists, Greensboro Grasshoppers, Greenville Drive, Hickory Crawdads, and Jersey Shore (formerly Lakewood) BlueClaws; alongside new opponents Aberdeen IronBirds, Brooklyn Cyclones, Hudson Valley Renegades, Wilmington Blue Rocks, Bowling Green Hot Rods, and Winston-Salem Dash. In 2022, the High-A East became known as the South Atlantic League, the name historically used by the regional circuit prior to the 2021 reorganization.

Team mascots

The Rome Braves have three mascots, Romey, Roxie, and introduced for the 2015 season their "son" Roman. Roman is also a furry blue humanoid male, his blue more matching that of Romey, with the added detail of his head being that of a baseball wearing a Roman soldier helmet.

Season-by-season records

Roster

Notable alumni

Hall of Fame alumni

 Tom Glavine (Played 1 game for the team in 2009)
 Chipper Jones (Played 1 game for the team in 2004, 3 games in 2005, 2 games in 2011, and 2 games in 2012)
 John Smoltz (2008) Inducted, 2016

Notable alumni

 Blaine Boyer
 Kyle Davies
 Yunel Escobar
 Julio Franco (Played 4 games for the team in 2007)
 Jeff Francoeur
 Max Fried
 Tommy Hanson
 Jason Heyward
 Omar Infante (Played 3 games for the team in 2009)
 Chuck James
 Kelly Johnson (Played 5 games for the team in 2006)
 Brandon Jones
 Brian Jordan (Played 1 game for the team in 2006)
 Jason Marquis (1997)
 Brian McCann
 Martín Prado
 David Ross (Played 2 games for the team in 2009)
 Jo-Jo Reyes
 Jarrod Saltalamacchia
 Ronald Acuna Jr. (2016)

Notes

External links
 Official website

South Atlantic League teams
Baseball teams established in 2003
Professional baseball teams in Georgia (U.S. state)
Atlanta Braves minor league affiliates
2003 establishments in Georgia (U.S. state)
High-A East teams
Rome, Georgia